Bill Riley Jr. is a retired ice hockey player and coach best known for his time leading Massachusetts–Lowell to three Division II Championships.

Playing career
Riley played three seasons for Boston University in the mid-to-late 1960s. In his first two years with the Terriers the team finished in the top 2 in the ECAC both times and reaching the NCAA Tournament both times. BU finished as the National Runner-Up in 1967 but for his senior season Riley managed to play in only 9 of 32 games and finished his playing career after the season. Riley's time with the Terriers coincided with another future hall of fame coach, Jack Parker.

Coaching career
Riley graduated with a degree in physical education and immediately put his degree to work as the head coach for Lehigh University. After only one season with the Mountain Hawks Riley left to take over at Lowell Tech who began playing College Division hockey two years earlier. Riley was warned bout outgoing coach Dick Morrison that Tech would 'Never be a winner.' but the 24-year-old Riley took the job anyway.

In his first season Riley got the Terriers to their first winning season, going 11–6, and continued to slowly build the program. The team was rechristened as the Lowell Tech Chiefs in 1971 and promptly made the ECAC Lower Division tournament the same season. Two years later the NCAA changed their classification system into numerical tiers and Lowell Tech joined the Division II ranks. In 1975, after setting a new program high of 14 wins, Lowell again changed their name, this time to the Lowell University Chiefs after merging with Lowell State. Two years later Riley brought in his first major recruit, landing Craig MacTavish who led the team with 88 points in his sophomore season en route to a 27-6 record the program's first ECAC championship and National title. MacTavish would leave after the year and go on to a long NHL tenure but the Chiefs didn't slip in the standings too much, finishing with 23 wins and a 3rd place finish in the NCAA tournament. The next season Lowell was back atop the heap, winning a second conference and national title. In 1981–82 Riley's team set the program record with 31 wins, dominated the ECAC tournament and took their third D-II National Championship with a 6-1 win over Plattsburgh State. Lowell went 29-2 the following season but lost in the National Semifinal, ruining their chance at a third consecutive National Championship.

With little left to prove at the Division II level, Lowell jumped up to Division I in 1983–84 and were accepted into ECAC Hockey as a provisional member. Playing much stiffer competition, Lowell produced its first losing season in 10 years but still finished with a respectable 15–16–3 mark. The following year Lowell joined 6 other New England-based schools in forming the new Hockey East conference but it took two more years before Lowell produced another winning record. When the NCAA tournament expanded to 12 teams in 1988 Lowell received its first berth into the postseason as a 6 seed, losing both games convincingly to Wisconsin. Over the next three seasons Lowell wallowed near the bottom of their conference and Riley resigned after the 1991 season in the midst of an investigation that determined he had violated NCAA regulations between 1987 and 1989 by offering lower than normal rent to players in buildings he co-owned. Lowell was put on probation for 2 years following the investigation and, though the team would eventually recover, Riley's coaching career was at an end.

Awards
Riley was inducted into the Massachusetts Hockey Hall of Fame along with his late father Bill Sr. in 2006, the Massachusetts–Lowell Athletic Hall of Fame in 2013 and received the Hobey Baker Legends of College Hockey Award in 2017.

Personal life
Riley earned a Masters in physical education in 1972 from his alma mater and a Ph.D in sports psychology in 1981.

College Head coaching record

† Lowell was a provisional member of ECAC Hockey and only played a non-conference schedule.

References

External links

Year of birth unknown
Living people
American men's ice hockey centers
Boston University Terriers men's ice hockey players
UMass Lowell River Hawks men's ice hockey coaches
People from Medford, Massachusetts
Ice hockey coaches from Massachusetts
Year of birth missing (living people)
Ice hockey players from Massachusetts